Members of the New South Wales Legislative Council who served from 1894 to 1895 were appointed for life by the Governor on the advice of the Premier. This list includes members between the election on 17 July 1894 and the election on 24 July 1895. The President was Sir John Lackey.

Although a loose party system had emerged in the Legislative Assembly at this time, there was no real party structure in the council.

See also
Reid ministry

Notes

References

 

Members of New South Wales parliaments by term
19th-century Australian politicians